Desy Ratnasari (born in Sukabumi, West Java, Indonesia on December 12, 1973) is an Indonesian actress, singer and politician of Sundanese descent. She is currently serving as a member of the People's Representative Council from National Mandate Party.

Life
Ratnasari was born in Sukabumi in 1973. She was a model who became an actor, presenter and singer. She and her husband, Sammy, have one child. Amongst her films are the 1990 films Blok M and Guntur tengah malam and in 2001 she appeared in Telegram.

In 1999 she won a Panasonic award for best Television actress.

Political career
In 2014, she was elected to become a member of the People's Representative Council by the West Java IV electoral district. She was reelected in 2019.

References

1973 births
Living people
People from Sukabumi
Indonesian actresses